Drienok is a mountain in the Greater Fatra Range of Slovakia measuring . The typical pyramidal shape of the mountain, which lies on the edge of the range, steeply rises over the Turiec valley and is easily recognizable from any direction. Under the summit there is an emblematic dead and dry tree.

From 2007 it was renamed from "Drieňok" to "Drienok".

Gallery

References

Veľká Fatra
Mountains of Slovakia
Mountains of the Western Carpathians